Macrorhamphosodes is a genus of spikefishes native to the Indian and western Pacific Oceans.

Species
There are currently 2 recognized species in this genus:
 Macrorhamphosodes platycheilus Fowler, 1934 (Trumpetsnout spikefish)
 Macrorhamphosodes uradoi Kamohara, 1933 (Trumpetsnout)

References

Tetraodontiformes
Marine fish genera
Taxa named by Henry Weed Fowler